Paradroid is a Commodore 64 computer game written by Andrew Braybrook and published by Hewson Consultants in 1985. It is a shoot 'em up with puzzle elements and was critically praised at release. The objective is to clear a fleet of spaceships of hostile robots by destroying them or taking them over via a mini-game. It was later remade as Paradroid 90 for the Commodore Amiga and Atari ST home computers and as Paradroid 2000 for the Acorn Archimedes. There exist several fan-made remakes for modern PCs.  In 2004 the Commodore 64 version was re-released as a built-in game on the C64 Direct-to-TV, and in 2008 for the Wii Virtual Console in Europe.

Gameplay

Enemy forces have hijacked a space fleet by turning its robot consignment against the crew; the job is to neutralize all the robots, thereby rescuing the humans. The players control a prototype influence device that allows them to control the hostile robots.

The game is set on a spaceship viewed from a top-down perspective. The ship consists of numerous rooms and levels, each one populated by hostile robots or "androids". The player, in control of a special droid called the "Influence Device", must destroy all the other droids on the ship. Each droid (including the player) is represented as a circle around a three-digit number. The numbers roughly correspond to the droid's "power" or "level", in that higher-numbered droids are tougher to destroy; there are 24 droid types.

The Influence Device is numbered "001". The primary way in which the Influence Device destroys other droids is by "linking" with them, effectively taking them over.  When the player takes over another droid, the previously controlled droid is destroyed.

Taking over a droid is done via a mini-game involving basic circuit diagrams and logic gates. Each droid has one side of the screen, with a series of logic gates and circuits connected together. The droids have a number of "power supplies" that can apply power to one circuit. Higher-numbered droids have more power supplies. At the end of a short time period, the droid supplying the most power to the circuit "wins". The logic gates are the key to allowing lower-numbered droids to beat higher-numbered droids. There is also a strategy in timing when power is applied to a circuit (as two supplies of power to the same circuit result in the later supplier of power gaining control of the circuit). It is possible for the transfer game to end in a draw. If this occurs a replay will take place.

In either case, the droid being controlled by the player is destroyed. If the player beats the droid in this mini-game, they take control of that droid.  If not, either the droid is destroyed and the player returned to the game as just the Influence Device (if they were previously controlling a different droid), or the player is killed, ending the game, if they were not already controlling another droid before the takeover attempt.

While in control of another droid, the player effectively acts as that droid, meaning the player has access to that droid's maneuverability, armor, weapons and "power supplies" (used during the droid-control mini-game). If the droid has weapons, the player can destroy other droids by shooting them instead of taking them over, though higher-numbered droids can require several shots to destroy and might fire back.  The player has control of a droid only for a limited amount of time (which is inversely proportional to the droid's number). If that time elapses, the controlled droid self-destructs and the player reverts to the Influence Device (001).

The spaceship has 20 decks, each with many rooms; the game has more than 400 screens. Doors and elevators connect the rooms and the decks. Only droids in the player's line of sight are visible, although doors being operated by out-of-sight droids can be seen moving. Many rooms have computer terminals that provide access to maps of the current deck and the entire ship as well as droid information. Each droid can access information about itself and all lower-numbered droids (this access is available to the player based on the droid being controlled).

Goals and challenges
As well as achieving a high score, Paradroid players can aim to completely clear one or more ships of robots and to achieve a successful transfer from the 001 Influence Device to the unstable 999 droid. Despite the instructions referring to a finite fleet, the Commodore 64 game never ends. When clearing the eighth ship called "Itsnotardenuff", the players are just placed back on the ship with higher-ranking droids on each deck.

History

Development
During the development of the original game, Andrew Braybrook kept a diary that was published in Zzap!64 magazine, in which he stated:

The game was influenced by several different computer games and movies, and was built on top of a previous game, "Survive", developed by GEC Marconi. Author Andrew Braybrook said in a Retro Gamer interview that the droid-swapping idea came from an arcade game, Front Line, where the player could enter a tank and had to leave it when it got hit. In another Retro Gamer feature, Braybrook also stated that the cover of the Black Sabbath album Technical Ecstasy influenced him, where two droids "interfacing" can be observed, along with the corridors of the movie Aliens. Development started right after Braybrook finished his previous game Gribbly's Day Out and even shared some code with Gribbly's. Later when Braybrook was working on Morpheus he did another diary for Zzap!64 where he revealed that the then recently released Competition Edition of Paradroid was 50% faster than the original. In the same series he revealed that they had redone the Paradroid graphics in the new  (Morpheus) style, which was later released as Heavy Metal Paradroid.
Andrew Braybrook did another diary during the development of Paradroid 90 for Amiga Action.

Versions
 1985 – Paradroid
 1986 – Paradroid Competition Edition – Released as a double pack at Christmas with Uridium+, plays faster than the original, mainly due to scroll code enhancements.
 1987 – Heavy Metal Paradroid – Paradroid with Morpheus style graphics (budget release in 1989).
 1990 – Paradroid 90 (Commodore Amiga, Atari ST)
 1993 – Paradroid 2000 (Acorn Archimedes)

Reception
The game has been heralded as one of the best original games to appear on the Commodore 64, as can be seen when the readers of Retro Gamer selected it as the best game on the platform:

Also in a 2002 Zzap!64 tribute publication, Paradroid via a community vote was ranked the best C64 game ever with the comment "there is something about Paradroid that sets it apart from other C64 games".

When it originally came out it received 97 out of 100 in the Zzap!64 November 1985 issue with the comment "THE classic shoot em up" and receiving a "Gold Medal" where 98% is the highest score ever given in the magazine, once again 97 out of 100 with the remark "A game no C64 gamer should be without", in 1989 for the re-issued "Heavy Metal" Edition. In November 1988 it was selected the second best Shoot 'em up on the C64 and in December the same year it was selected the third best game by Zzap!64 magazine.

Info rated Paradroid four-plus stars out of five. Praising how all of the large game fit into the Commodore 64's memory, the magazine concluded that "if you like science fiction, arcade games, inspiring graphics, and intricate gameplay, you will LOVE Paradroid!".

Paradroid 90 received "C+VG Hit" with a score of 93% in Computer and Video Games and was ranked the 22nd best game of all time by Amiga Power.

Other clones and games inspired by Paradroid

Several Freeware or free and open source software clones of the game have been published:
 Paradroid for Windows and Linux, current version 1.3 (March 2004), which garnered favourable reviews at the Home of the Underdogs.
 Freedroid Classic for Windows, Linux, OS X and Sharp Zaurus, current version 1.0.2 (2004)
 Project Paradroid for Windows, current version 2 (2006)
 Paradroid Redux is a reimplementation of the original Commodore 64 code, fixing bugs and adding features.
 Freedroid RPG is a Diablo-style role-playing video game based on Freedroid Classic, inheriting only the main theme of fighting hostile robots, the takeover-game, and the robot models.
 Urbanoids

Quazatron
Andrew Braybrook's Graftgold partner, Steve Turner, wrote a version of Paradroid for the ZX Spectrum called Quazatron in 1986, also published by Hewson. Gameplay was similar but on an isometric playing field, and based in cities rather than spacecraft.

See also 
C64 Direct-to-TV (the "30 C64 games in 1 joystick" unit)

References

External links 

 (Heavy Metal Paradroid)
Paradroid at the C64 Wiki
Paradroid 90 at Lemon Amiga
Birth of a Paradroid – the original diary of the making of the game by Andrew Braybrook
Longplay (Video) at www.c64-longplays.de
Longplay (Video) at www.archive.org/details/C64GVA230-Paradroid
Paradroid Remake in progress

1985 video games
Acorn Archimedes games
Amiga games
Atari ST games
Commodore 64 games
Graftgold games
IOS games
Shoot 'em ups
Single-player video games
Video games developed in the United Kingdom
Virtual Console games
Hewson Consultants games